Tržac may refer to:

 Tržac (Aleksandrovac), a village in Serbia
 Tržac (Cazin), a village in Bosnia and Herzegovina